Augustine Geve was a Solomon Islands Catholic priest and politician.

He was first elected to Parliament in the December 2001 general election, as MP for South Guadalcanal, at the time of the violent ethnic conflict on Guadalcanal. He was then appointed Minister for Youth, Women and Sports in Prime Minister Allan Kemakeza's Cabinet.

On August 20, 2002, he was assassinated by Ronnie Cawa, Francis Lela and warlord Harold Keke "on a remote beach" on Guadalcanal. The three men were convicted for the crime and several other murders in March 2005 by High Court judge (and future Governor General) Frank Kabui, who sentenced them to life in jail. Geve's vacant seat in Parliament was filled in a by-election, and he was succeeded by Victor Totu.

References

2002 deaths
Members of the National Parliament of the Solomon Islands
People from Guadalcanal Province
Solomon Islands Roman Catholic priests
Solomon Islands Roman Catholics
20th-century Roman Catholic priests
21st-century Roman Catholic priests
Assassinated Solomon Islands politicians
People murdered in the Solomon Islands
Year of birth missing
Women's ministers of the Solomon Islands
Sports ministers of the Solomon Islands